Swimming at the 1999 South Pacific Games took place in Agana, the capital of Guam, at the Southern High School Pool between 30 May and 5 June 1999. It was the eleventh edition of the South Pacific Games. Men's and women's open water events of 5 kilometres were introduced in 1999, with swimmers from American Samoa, Fiji, Guam, New Caledonia, Northern Marianas, Micronesia, Palau, Papua New Guinea, Samoa, and Tahiti competing.

Medal summary

Medal table

Men
New Caledonia dominated the men's events, winning 14 of the 17 races. Olivier Saminadin collected a personal tally of 13 gold medals including the 5 km open water event.

Women
New Caledonia won 8 of the 17 women's events. Fiji won 6 gold medals due to the performance of Caroline Pickering. Lara Grangeon won the 5 km  open water event.

Participating countries
Swimmers from 9 countries were entered in the swimming events at the 1999 Games. The teams were:

Notes
GR denotes South Pacific Games record time.

 The medal list published on the Oceania Sport Information Centre (OSIC) website as of October 2015, omits the women's 4 × 200 m freestyle relay, as marked up with a (blue background) in the table above. The result sheet for the event, however, records New Caledonia, Papua New Guinea and Northern Marianas as finishing first, second and third, respectively (with Guam in fourth). These placings are counted in the medal tally.

 The medal list uploaded by OSIC (as at October 2015), shows not all medals were awarded for the 4 × 100 m medley and 4 × 200 m freestyle relays for men, 4 × 100 m medley relay for women. All placings are recorded in the tables above as per the original result sheets, but are marked up with a (grey background) for those finishing positions where no medal recipient is recorded. These placings are not counted in the medal tally.

 The 4 × 200 m Freestyle relay for men has only a gold medal winner recorded. As such, the medal tally on this page does not include silver and bronze medals for this event, although the result sheet records Guam and French Polynesia as finishing in second and third place respectively.

 The 4 × 100 m Medley relay for men does not have a bronze medal recipient recorded. As such, the medal tally on this page does not include a bronze for the French Polynesia team in this event, although the result sheet records them as finishing in third place.

 The 4 × 100 m Medley relay for women does not have a bronze medal recipient recorded. As such, the medal tally on this page does not include a bronze for the Northern Marianas team in this event, although the result sheet records them as finishing in third place.

References

Sources

1999 Pacific Games
Pacific Games
Swimming at the Pacific Games